Christensen may refer to:

 Christensen (surname)
 Christensen (constructor), a former racing car constructor
 164P/Christensen, a periodic comet
 170P/Christensen, a periodic comet

See also
Christiansen
Christianson
Kristiansen